"Monster Maker" is a 1989 45-minute television special, adapted by Matthew Jacobs from the 1979 novel of the same name by Nicholas Fisk.

Harry Dean Stanton plays an American Special Effects expert living in England, who is befriended by a young fan named Matt Banting (played by Kieran O'Brien). From Jim Henson's London-based Henson Associates, it was produced by Duncan Kenworthy and directed by Giles Foster.

The show aired as a standalone special in the UK. In the US, it aired as an episode of The Jim Henson Hour.

Introduction
Jim Henson talks about the Creature Shop, showing one of the devils from The Storyteller as an example of what the Creature Shop can make. A puppet later used as The Predator on Dinosaurs can also be seen in a movie that Matt is watching. He then introduces the Monster Maker.

Plot

Teenager Matt Banting wants to work with a famous but eccentric creature/fx (special effects) man, but he gets more than he bargained for when one of the creatures, the giant dragon-like Ultragorgon seems to come to life and takes Matt under his wing. Matt is forced to confront his inner monsters while working out his issues with his father.

Conclusion
Jim Henson mentions that although the creatures look real, they are not actually alive. He tells how many performers were needed for the Ultragorgon (including Brian Henson operating the head). He also brings out Kermit the Frog who comments that he liked the special.

Notes
 This episode was later re-aired as a stand-alone special without the framing introduction and closing, or The Jim Henson Hour title/logos.

Credits
 Michael Gambon as Ultragorgon (voice)
 Jonathan Coy as Teacher
 Matthew Scurfield as Vaughn
 Bill Moody as Reg
 Grant Bardsley as Ben
 Alison Steadman as Perriwinkle
 Amanda Dickinson as Mother
 George Costigan as Father
 Harry Dean Stanton as Chancey Bellow
 Kieran O'Brien as Matt Banting

Ultragorgon operated by Martin Anthony, Tony Ashton, Michael Bayliss, Marcus Clarke, Sue Dacre, David Greenaway, Brian Henson, and Christopher Leith.

External links
 

Puppet films
The Jim Henson Company films
Television shows based on British novels
Films directed by Giles Foster